Sphingomonas alpina  is a Gram-negative, aerobic, psychrophilic and motile bacteria from the genus of Sphingomonas which has been isolated from alpine soil from the High Tauern in Austria.

References

Further reading

External links
Type strain of Sphingomonas alpina at BacDive -  the Bacterial Diversity Metadatabase	

alpina
Psychrophiles
Bacteria described in 2012